Bargeboard (probably from Medieval Latin bargus, or barcus, a scaffold, and not from the now obsolete synonym "vergeboard") or rake fascia is a board fastened to each projecting gable of a roof to give it strength and protection, and to conceal the otherwise exposed end grain of the horizontal timbers or purlins of the roof.

History
Historically, bargeboards are sometimes moulded only or carved, but as a rule the lower edges were cusped and had tracery in the spandrels besides being otherwise elaborated. An example in Britain was one at Ockwells in Berkshire (built 1446–1465), which was moulded and carved as if it were intended for internal work.

Modern residential rake fascias are typically made of 2-by dimensional lumber, with trim added for decoration and/or weatherproofing later.

See also 
 Antefix
 Cornice
 Eaves
 Fascia
 Karamon – use in Japanese architecture
 Soffit

References

External links 

Roofs